Dendeviin Terbishdagva is a politician from Mongolia who served as Acting Prime Minister of Mongolia in 14 November 2014 and Deputy Prime Minister of Mongolia from August 2012 to November 2014.

Career 
He was the Senior Deputy of Norovyn Altankhuyag ,Minister of Food from 2004 to 2007 and also was the Member of parliament to the State Great Khural in 2014 and elected as legislator in 2008 Mongolian legislative election.

References 

Mongolian politicians